Peeter Ello (11 February 1955 Tallinn – 17 March 1997 Tallinn) was an Estonian politician. He was a member of VII Riigikogu.

References

1955 births
Members of the Riigikogu, 1992–1995
1997 deaths